RSS Supreme (73) is the sixth ship of the Formidable-class stealth frigate of the Republic of Singapore Navy.

Construction and career 
RSS Supreme was built by ST Marine Engineering company in Singapore around the late in the 2000s. Supreme was commissioned on 16 January 2009.

RIMPAC 2010 
RSS Supreme participated in RIMPAC 2010 from 23 June to 1 August 2010. RSS Supreme fired her Aster 15 Surface-to-Air Missile (SAM) off the coast of Hawaii. Chief of Navy Rear-Admiral Chew Men Leong was on board to observe the live-firing exercises.

CARAT 2011 
RSS Vigour, RSS Stalwart and RSS Supreme conducted a joint exercise with USS Chung-Hoon on 23 August 2011.

Indonesia AirAsia Flight 8501 

In December 2014, Supreme was deployed in the search for Airasia Flight QZ8501 after it crashed into the Java Sea on 28 December 2014; along with the RSN ships Persistence, Valour, and Kallang, MV Swift Rescue, and two Lockheed C-130H Hercules.

PASSEX 2016 
The Republic of Singapore Navy and the Royal Australian Navy conducted a passage exercise which consists of RSS Supreme, HMAS Darwin and HMAS Adelaide. One of HMAS Adelaide's MRH-90 helicopter lands on Supreme deck.

On 6 April 2018, RSS Supreme and RSS Valiant underwent alongside USS Sampson and USS Theodore Roosevelt off Singapore.

RSS Supreme and USNS Carl Brasher conducted a replenish at sea on 26 June 2020.

RIMPAC 2020 
RSS Supreme joined HMAS Stuart, HMAS Sirius, USS Rafael Peralta and KDB Darulehsan on their way to Pearl Harbor, Hawaii in preparation for RIMPAC 2020 on 6 August. RIMPAC 2020 is scheduled to start on 17 August.

Gallery

References 

Ships of the Republic of Singapore Navy
2005 ships
Formidable-class frigates
Republic of Singapore Navy